Kuyashtyr (Quyaştır) is a rural locality (a selo) and the administrative center of Askinsky Selsoviet, Askinsky District, Bashkortostan, Russia. The population was 322 as of 2010. There are 9 streets.

Geography 
Kuyashtyr is located 8 km south of Askino (the district's administrative centre) by road. Korolyovo is the nearest rural locality.

References 

Rural localities in Askinsky District